Charles Édouard Masson Huot (6 April 1855 – 27 January 1930) was a French-Canadian painter and illustrator.

Biography
Huot was born in Québec City, the son of a merchant. Having demonstrated a talent for drawing at an early age, he was enrolled in the  when he was only ten. The local Abbé was impressed with his talents and set up a subscription committee to raise funds for him to study in Europe. In 1874, he moved to Paris, where he attended the École des Beaux-arts and studied in the workshop of Alexandre Cabanel. He participated in numerous exhibitions there (including the Salon in 1876) and his painting of "The Good Samaritan" was purchased by Patrice MacMahon on behalf of the French Government in 1878. He married Louise Schlachter in 1885, returned to Canada in 1886 on the promise of a large commission and settled in Quebec City.

After a brief return to Paris to retrieve his wife and daughter, there were several more commissions of a religious nature. He returned to Canada in 1904, alone. Details for this period in his life are rather sketchy. The following year, he rejoined his family in Brussels and lived in Saint-Malo, France. In 1907, his wife died and he brought his daughter back to Canada.

The Parliament Building
In 1910, he was selected by a committee (consisting of Thomas Chapais, Eugène-Étienne Taché and ) to compose two large historical paintings for the Parliament Building ("Sovereign Council" and the "Debate on Languages"), executed between 1910 and 1913, with an occasional break to do research. This produced another commission for a painting on the theme Je me souviens (Québec's motto) for the building's ceiling. It would take him another seven years to prepare and finish this work. At the time of his death, he was engaged in another large commission for the building, that had to be completed by his students. 
  
Among his illustrations are those for L'Art d'être grand-père by Victor Hugo.

He died in 1855 in Sillery.

References

External links

 
 ArtNet: More paintings by Huot
 Charles Huot et la peinture d'histoire au Palais législatif de Québec (1883-1930), Web Robert DEROME, professeur honoraire d'histoire de l'art, Université du Québec à Montréal.

1855 births
1930 deaths
19th-century Canadian painters
Canadian male painters
20th-century Canadian painters
Artists from Quebec City
19th-century Canadian male artists
20th-century Canadian male artists
Canadian alumni of the École des Beaux-Arts